Aashiq, a word meaning one who practices ishq (love) in Urdu and Hindi, may refer to:

People
Aashiq Abu (born 1978), Indian film director, producer, actor, and distributor in Malayalam cinema

Arts and entertainment
Aashiq (1962 film), a Hindi movie directed by Hrishikesh Mukherjee
Aashiq (2001 film), a Hindi movie directed by Indra Kumar
Aashiq Sawney, a fictional character from the British soap opera Doctors

See also
Ashik, bards in the Caucasus and Anatolia
Aşık, Turkish name
Ishq (disambiguation)